Saomei dunlun Dongdu ji, also known as Dongyouji, is a novel written in the Ming dynasty by Chinese author Fang Ruhao. Dongdu ji tells of two respected Buddhist monks—Burumiduo and Bodhidharma, who leads his three disciples from India to China to promote their religion. Described as a shanshu or "morality book", the novel was first published in 1635.

Contents
Written in vernacular Chinese, the first eighteen chapters of Dongdu ji follow Venerable Burumiduo as he rescues "the masses of lost people in Southern and Eastern India", while the rest of the novel's one hundred chapters revolve around Bodhidharma and his three disciples, as they journey from India to China to preach about Buddhism. The novel's structure is modelled after that of Journey to the West.

Publication history
The novel was first published in Suzhou in 1635, during the twilight of the Ming dynasty. Although Ming dynasty writer Fang Ruhao is conventionally credited as the author of Dongdu ji, French researcher Vincent Durand-Dastès alleges that the novel—which he describes as both a shanshu or "morality book" and an adventure novel—might instead have been written by the author of the 17th-century novel Sanjiao kaimi guizheng yanyi or The Romance of the Three Teachings. Early editions of the text are housed in both the Peking University Library and the Jigendo Library in Japan. The novel was translated into Korean under the title Dongyugi sometime in the nineteenth century, with a few surviving volumes now kept by the Institute of Oriental Manuscripts of the Russian Academy of Sciences. A partial French translation of Dongdu ji by Durand-Dastès was published in 2008 under the title La Conversion de l’Orient.

Critical reception
Translator Vincent Durand-Dastès criticised the novel's "frequently ponderous style" and "simplistic plot structure", but acknowledged that it provided great insight into the cultural climate of the late Ming dynasty.

Notes

References

Citations

Bibliography

  
 
 
 
  
 

Ming dynasty literature
Novels set in India
Novels set in China
1635 books